Frank S. Cahill  (27 January 1876, in Calumet Island, Quebec – 17 April 1934), was a politician, broker, clerk and real estate broker.

The son of William Cahill, he was educated in Campbell's Bay, Quebec. Cahill worked as a postal clerk in Sault Ste. Marie, Michigan for several years, then moved to Saskatchewan, working as a real estate broker in Saskatoon. In 1909, he opened another real estate office in Ottawa. Cahill married Mildred Coyne in 1910.

He was elected to the House of Commons of Canada as a Member of the Liberal Party (Laurier Liberal) caucus in the 1917 election to represent the riding of Pontiac. He was re-elected in 1921, 1925 and 1926 then defeated in 1930.

Electoral record

References

External links
 

1876 births
1934 deaths
Laurier Liberals
Liberal Party of Canada MPs
Members of the House of Commons of Canada from Quebec
Place of death missing